Archambeault is a surname. Notable people with the name include:

 Horace Archambeault (1857–1918), Canadian politician and judge from Quebec
 Joseph-Alfred Archambeault (1859–1913) Canadian Roman Catholic priest and bishop
 Larry Archambeault (1919–1981), Canadian ice hockey player
 Louis Archambeault (1814–1890), Canadian notary and political figure from Quebec

See also
 Archambault (disambiguation)